Albert Fahr was a piano manufacturer in Zeitz in the Prussian Province of Saxony, Germany. 

The owner Albert Fahr was awarded an imperial and royal warrant of appointment to the court of Austria-Hungary.

References 

Companies based in Saxony-Anhalt
Piano manufacturing companies of Germany
Purveyors to the Imperial and Royal Court
Companies of Prussia